Liverpool South Parkway station (Formerly Allerton railway station), is a railway station and bus interchange in the Garston district of Liverpool, England. It serves, via a bus link, Liverpool John Lennon Airport in the neighbouring suburb of Speke, as well as providing an interchange between main line services and the Merseyrail rapid transit/commuter rail network.

The station is located towards the southern end of Merseyrail's Northern Line and on the junction of two main lines: the Merseytravel City Line from Liverpool to Manchester via Warrington and the Liverpool branch of the West Coast Main Line to London via .

Allerton Traction Maintenance Depot is situated to the immediate east of the station.

History

The station was built at a crossing point between two railway lines that had until then been served by separate stations. The first was the Cheshire Lines Committee (CLC) line from Liverpool Central to Manchester via Warrington Central, which ran from west to east. The second was the line built by the St Helens Railway from Liverpool Lime Street to Warrington Bank Quay, which crossed from northwest to southeast. The latter route became part of the Liverpool branch of the West Coast Main Line when it was connected to a new route from Crewe via the newly built Runcorn Railway Bridge. The original line to Warrington Bank Quay is now closed to passenger trains. The two lines were served by two separate stations in the area, respectively Garston and Allerton (though the latter was also located in Garston).

The first proposals for an interchange station at Garston were made in the 1960s and 1970s, when the Merseyrail semi-underground network was being planned. At the time, the suggestion was that the new station and Broad Green would be interchanges between long-distance trains and trains on an outer orbital line (the North Liverpool Extension Line). However, the latter line closed in 1972. The line from Liverpool Central to Garston was also closed in 1972, with trains on the CLC route being diverted to Liverpool Lime Street. The route from Liverpool Central to Garston was reopened in 1978 as part of the Merseyrail Northern Line. After 1983, this route was extended to Hunts Cross, the next station to the east.

As the orbital route had been closed, the impetus to eventually complete the station was to improve public transport access to the expanding Liverpool John Lennon Airport, and also to provide new journey opportunities for rail passengers in south Liverpool by giving easy interchange between Northern Line, City Line and West Coast Main Line services.

Construction began in 2004. Allerton station closed in July 2005 and the new station was built on its site. The concourse, bus station and car park were built on land that was once the home of South Liverpool F.C. An information board situated on the footpath towards the main road explains the history of the site. The station opened on 11 June 2006, the day after Garston station closed.

At the time of opening, the Merseytravel City Line service (which had been hourly at the former Allerton station) was increased to half-hourly. The station also became an additional stop on the Liverpool-Birmingham service (then operated by Central Trains). From 11 December 2006, the Monday-Saturday evening service on the Northern Line was increased to run every 15 minutes, instead of half-hourly as previously.

Initially, many long-distance services omitted Liverpool South Parkway from their timetables, however more train services were gradually introduced. In December 2008 the Birmingham service was doubled in frequency, and East Midlands Trains services began calling at the station.

In May 2011, Blackpool North services which operated from Lime Street were extended to start and terminate at Liverpool South Parkway. The service is operated by Northern Trains and does not call at stations between South Parkway and Lime Street. The service from Lime Street is unchanged. Trains travelling from Blackpool North to Liverpool South Parkway have a 15-minute dwelling time at Liverpool Lime Street.

In early 2017 Liverpool South Parkway served as a temporary hub for national trains whilst Lime Street was closed due to a landslide. In September of the year, platform 4 was temporarily extended by 150 metres to allow intercity services to serve the station whilst Lime Street station was shut for refurbishment work. In mid-2018 the station again acted as a hub whilst Lime Street was upgraded.

Criticism
Originally scheduled to open in December 2005, the project fell behind schedule, and finally opened on 11 June 2006. The construction cost, originally estimated to be £16 million, had doubled to £32 million by the time construction was completed. Merseytravel rejected criticism of the delays and cost increase, stating that it had been caused by factors beyond its control, such as the collapse of Railtrack, increasing steel costs and poor weather causing flooding at the construction site.

Tom Wileman, regional director of bus operator Stagecoach, described Liverpool South Parkway as a "white elephant". However, from 28 September 2008 Stagecoach service 82 was rerouted to serve the station; and from December 2008, trains operated by Stagecoach-owned East Midlands Trains began calling.

Facilities

The station has six platforms (four high-level platforms on the West Coast Main Line and a further two on the Northern Line), a bus station for local bus services, taxi rank, car park, bicycle storage, café and passenger lounge.

The station has been designed to use environmentally friendly techniques wherever possible. Some of the building's electricity is provided by photovoltaic cells. A 700,000 litre rainwater harvesting system has also been installed to reduce the use of mains water. This water will be used for cleaning and washing, as well as toilet flushes. All timber used has been certified by the Forest Stewardship Council as being from a well-managed forest. The roof is made from recycled aluminium instead of virgin materials. The automatic doors at each of the five bus stances open only when a bus arrives, enhancing safety but also retaining heat within the building and avoiding excessive openings of the doors. The free-access main entrance uses a revolving door to avoid draughts.

In August 2006, Liverpool South Parkway won the Innovation Award at Network Rail's annual Environment Awards.

In June 2009 the station underwent some enhancements, and saw the introduction of a new travel centre and a heated passenger lounge with wifi internet access, comfortable chairs and free newspapers, adjacent to the café; ticket barriers at both ends of the concourse were also installed.

A ticket vending machine, allowing collection of tickets booked online, was installed in July 2014.

In November 2016, an MtoGo shop was opened, selling a range of snacks and drinks alongside tickets. This replaced the former travel centre, which was converted into a Costa Coffee outlet in the summer of 2017.

Services

Merseyrail

On the Northern Line (Platforms 5 and 6), trains run every 15 minutes, Monday to Saturday, to Southport via Liverpool Central, with a half-hourly service on Sundays.

TransPennine Express

The South TransPennine service from Liverpool to  serves the station hourly. The December 2022 timetable change is the first time since May 2018 that TransPennine Express has served the station.

Northern Trains

On the high-level platforms (1 and 2), Northern Trains provide three trains per hour on the City Line. An hourly semi-fast service runs to Manchester Airport.

East Midlands Railway

London Northwestern Railway

London Northwestern Railway services between Liverpool Lime Street and  call at Liverpool South Parkway. The service runs half-hourly Monday to Saturday, and hourly on Sundays. Selected services use platform 3. As of May 2019, many services continue to  via .

Transport for Wales

Transport for Wales services between Liverpool Lime Street and Chester serve the station hourly, with a single early evening service extended to Wrexham General.

Avanti West Coast

Avanti West Coast services do not normally serve the station. The platforms are not long enough to accommodate a 9 or 11 coach Pendolino train. However, platform 4 was temporarily extended in 2017 to permit services operated by Virgin Trains (Avanti's predecessor) to use the station while Lime Street was closed for major engineering works in autumn 2017 and summer 2018.

Bus services

Bus services run from the station to Liverpool John Lennon Airport, Aigburth, Dingle, Mossley Hill, Penny Lane, Liverpool City Centre, Belle Vale. Services are operated by Arriva North West and Stagecoach Merseyside & South Lancashire. Passengers can use local services 80A and 86A for transfer to/from the airport.

Former services
From 23 May 2011, Northern Rail introduced direct services to Blackpool North. This was achieved by extending the existing Blackpool to Liverpool service. Trains ran non-stop from Liverpool South Parkway to Liverpool Lime Street, where they reversed to continue their journey to Blackpool. Seven trains operated Monday-Saturday, all outside the peaks with no direct evening or Sunday service. This service ceased to serve South Parkway in May 2018, reverting to operate between Liverpool Lime Street and Blackpool North only.

TransPennine Express served the station on its Scarborough services until 2018. This service was replaced with a service by Northern service, to Manchester, but has since been replaced by a new service to Cleethorpes by TPE, thus restoring services to the station.
 
A shuttle bus formerly provided a link to the National Trust's property at Speke Hall, running weekends and bank holidays between April and September.

Future
Merseytravel have stated that they aim to work with the train operators to improve the train service at Liverpool South Parkway, introducing new services with each twice-yearly timetable change.

Other new services which have been proposed but not confirmed are:
 Additional shuttle services between Liverpool South Parkway and Liverpool Lime Street on the City Line
 More frequent Sunday services on the Northern Line
 Merseytravel have repeatedly asked for an Avanti West Coast service from Liverpool South Parkway.

Proposals for High Speed 2 raise the possibility of London trains calling at Liverpool South Parkway. This could be as part of the new high speed service to Liverpool or as part of a revised stopping pattern on the existing West Coast Main Line service.

Airport tram-train proposal
In August 2009, it was reported that a new tram-train link to Liverpool John Lennon Airport and a link to Kings Dock from the east of the city had been proposed. At Liverpool South Parkway, the tram-train would leave the existing railway line and seamlessly transfer to a new tramway. This project was referenced again in November 2016 in Merseytravel's Rail Development and Delivery presentation as a "top rail project". During the presentation, Merseytravel's Senior Head of Service Operations revealed that there were no immediate plans to develop the rail link and its feasibility depended on the airport's passenger numbers increasing.

Accidents and incidents
On 6 October 2017 a train derailed near the station. The incident occurred at low speed while not in passenger service. There were no injuries.

References

External links

Railway stations in Great Britain opened in 2006
Railway stations opened by Network Rail
Railway stations in Liverpool
DfT Category B stations
Airport railway stations in the United Kingdom
Railway stations served by East Midlands Railway
Railway stations served by Merseyrail
Northern franchise railway stations
Railway stations served by West Midlands Trains
South Parkway
Bus stations in Merseyside
Railway stations served by Transport for Wales Rail
Stations on the West Coast Main Line
Railway stations served by TransPennine Express